Fingerpost is a hamlet and road junction in north Worcestershire, England, approximately  west of Bewdley.

It is located at the junction of the A456 and A4117 roads, on the edge of the Wyre Forest and is named for a notable fingerpost that once existed at this historic junction.

Fingerpost is in the civil parish of Rock and the Wyre Forest District. The parish council erected a large commemorative stone near the Fingerpost junction for the Diamond Jubilee of Queen Elizabeth II.

Further along the A4117 is Far Forest, beyond which is Shropshire.

See also

References 

Hamlets in Worcestershire
Transport in Worcestershire